Nesse is a village in Dornum municipality in the East Frisian district of Aurich, in Lower Saxony, Germany. It is situated near the North Sea coast, approx. 2.5 km west of the village of Dornum, and 20 km north of the town of Aurich. As of 2008 the village and surrounding farms had a population of 669.

History
Prior to 2 August 1972, Nesse was the administrative seat of its own eponymously named municipality. From 2 August 1972 to 31 October 2001 it was part of the combined Dornum, Dornumersiel and Nesse municipality. In 2001 that municipality was renamed Dornum municipality.

Notes

Towns and villages in East Frisia